In enzymology, a cyclohexane-1,2-diol dehydrogenase is an enzyme that catalyzes the chemical reaction

trans-cyclohexane-1,2-diol + NAD+  2-hydroxycyclohexan-1-one + NADH + H+

Thus, the two substrates of this enzyme are trans-cyclohexane-1,2-diol and NAD+, whereas its 3 products are 2-hydroxycyclohexan-1-one, NADH, and H+.

This enzyme belongs to the family of oxidoreductases, specifically those acting on the CH-OH group of donor with NAD+ or NADP+ as acceptor. The systematic name of this enzyme class is trans-cyclohexane-1,2-diol:NAD+ 1-oxidoreductase. This enzyme participates in caprolactam degradation.

References

 

EC 1.1.1
NADH-dependent enzymes
Enzymes of unknown structure